Samuel Wynne (26 April 1897 – 30 April 1927) was a footballer who died while playing in a Football League First Division match.

Career
Wynne played as a right back and started his career in local-league football with Neston Colliery. He later had a spell with Welsh side Connah's Quay before joining Football League club Oldham Athletic at the start of the 1921–22 season. 

In 1923, Wynne became the first player to score two goals for both sides during Oldham's Football League First Division match against Manchester United. In 1976, Chris Nicholl became the second top tier player to achieve this feat playing for Aston Villa against Leicester City. 

Wynne stayed with Oldham for five seasons, making 145 league appearances in total, scoring nine goals. He signed for Bury in the summer of 1926 and played 18 league matches for the club before his death in April of the following year.

Death
On 30 April 1927, during Bury's Football League First Division match away to Sheffield United, Wynne collapsed while placing the ball for a free kick after the Sheffield forward Harry Johnson had been adjudged offside. He was stretchered from the field of play and pronounced dead; the cause of death was determined to be a cerebral haemorrhage. The match, which Sheffield had led 1–0 through an own goal from Bury's Jimmy Porter, was subsequently abandoned. Sam Wynne's memorial is located in Neston cemetery.

References

1897 births
1927 deaths
English footballers
Association football players who died while playing
Connah's Quay F.C. players
Oldham Athletic A.F.C. players
Bury F.C. players
English Football League players
People from Neston
Association football defenders
Sport deaths in England